The Gibraltar Fire and Rescue Service serves the City of Gibraltar.

Establishment and role
The history of a fire service in Gibraltar dates back to 1865. In 1976, the Gibraltar Fire and Rescue Service was established by the Fire Service Act 1976–19. Its name and purpose is specified as follows:3.(1) There shall be a fire and rescue service, to be called the Gibraltar Fire and Rescue Service , for the purpose of protecting life and property in case of fire or other calamity and of extinguishing fires endangering life and property within Gibraltar, other than those areas for the time being occupied by the Ministry of Defence.

External links
 Official website

References

Emergency services in Gibraltar
Government agencies of Gibraltar